Lolla is a village in Atreyapuram Mandal, Dr. B.R. Ambedkar Konaseema district in the state of Andhra Pradesh in India.

Geography 

Demographics 
 India census, Lolla had a population of 3950, out of which 2038 were male and 1912 were female. The population of children below 6 years of age was 10%. The literacy rate of the village was 67%.

References 

Villages in Atreyapuram mandal